Kisna: The Warrior Poet is a 2005 Indian Hindi-language period romance film written, edited, produced and directed by Subhash Ghai and starring Vivek Oberoi (who plays the title role), Antonia Bernath, and Isha Sharvani. The musical film is set in the British India of the tumultuous 1940s when Indian nationalists fighting for the country's independence rose up as one, urging the British Raj to leave. It is a love story about two people who are torn between Karma (the noble deed) and Dharma (the duty). The film has two veteran composers, A. R. Rahman and Ismail Darbar; the lyrics were written by Javed Akhtar. The film marked Amrish Puri's last appearance as he had not signed or acted in any film after it before passing away on 12 January 2005. The film, however, did not perform well at the box office.  The film was premiered in the Marché du Film section of the 2005 Cannes Film Festival.

Plot
Lady Catherine, a wealthy British woman, arrives in India to donate Rs 3500 Crores to charity as part of India's Republic Day Celebrations. Before she can hand over the money, she requests a visit to Devprayag, where India's 2 great rivers Bhagirathi and Alaknanda meet to form the mighty Ganges River. At Devprayag, Lady Catherine remembers her childhood and narrates her story to the small crowd, which includes a journalist.

Catherine was born in India in 1930, to British citizens living in the country. She had a privileged and peaceful upbringing. In 1935, a young Catherine befriends Kisna, a local village boy, and the two share a joyous friendship. Upon learning of this, Catherine's father forcefully sends her back to England.

In 1947, during the Independence Struggle, Catherine comes back to India on holidays and again meets Kisna. Their childhood friendship is rekindled and over time the feelings slowly develop into love. Their relationship is tested by the fact that they seemingly belong to the opposite sides of India's struggle for freedom. Kisna also reveals that he is engaged to be married to Lakshmi. 

There is growing resentment against colonialism and Catherine finds herself being targeted by an enraged mob of Indian nationalists. She is protected by Kisna, who faces backlash from his family and community, who were part of the mob. Kisna is torn between his friendship and love for Catherine, and his duty to his country and the hatred of the British Raj. Kisna takes it upon himself to escort Catherine to the British High Commission, where safe passage back to England can be arranged for her. The trip reaffirms their love for each other but Kisna is ultimately forced to choose between his feelings for Catherine and his duty to his country. He chooses the latter and the pair bid an emotional farewell to each other. 

In the present, it is revealed that Kisna married Lakshmi, and fulfilled his duties to his wife and country, but always loved Catherine till his death. His last wish was for his ashes to be spread at Devprayag, the place where first love blossomed between him and Catherine. Catherine's last wish is also for her ashes to be spread at Devprayag, so that, even though they both married different people, she and Kisna can be together forever.

Cast 
 Vivek Oberoi as Kisna Singh
 Isha Sharvani as Lakshmi
 Antonia Bernath as Katherine
 Anna Llewellyn as young Katherine
 Polly Adams as Lady Katherine
 Amrish Puri as Bhairo Singh
 Om Puri as Juman Masum Kishti
 Yashpal Sharma as Shankar Singh
 Sushmita Sen as Naima Begum 
 Zarina Wahab as Shanta
 Rajat Kapoor as Prince Raghuraj
 Jeetu Verma as Phunkara
 Hrishitaa Bhatt as Rukmani
 Ronit Roy as Jimmy (Special Appearance)
 Rahul Singh
 Vivek Mushran as Nandu

Production
The film was shot on sync sound under the direction of Dilip Subramaniam at Ranikhet on a budget of Rs.250 million ($5.48 million). Award-winning cinematographer Ashok Mehta, action director Tinu Verma, choreographer Saroj Khan, and production designer/art director Samir Chanda round out the crew.

Kisna: The Warrior Poet has two versions. A two-hour English version for the international market while the Hindi version will be a regular three-hour feature film with songs and dances.

Katrina Kaif auditioned for the film but was rejected.
source >> https://www.indiatoday.in/profile/story/the-rise-of-bollywood-beauty-katrina-kaif-126985-2011-01-28

Soundtrack

Subhash Ghai combined the musical talent of A. R. Rahman and Ismail Darbar to create the soundtrack. Ghai roped in his usual associate Rahman originally, but had to sign in Ismail Darbar to complete the project as Rahman was busy with the works of The Lord of the Rings. Ghai says: "Rahman was my original choice because it is an international project and I wanted both the festive and soulful element of Indian music. However, he was busy with the Lord of Rings and excused (himself saying) that he won't be able to do the whole album. So he has done the theme song and the English song. Then I asked Ismail to do the rest because apart from Rahman he has the knowledge and ability to fuse Western and Indian classical music. The way he has used Ustad Rashid Khan's voice in "Kahe Ujare Mori Neend" is really captivating. The music has turned out so well that you can't distinguish an Ismail song from a Rahman one".

Rahman returned to do the background score of the movie, on Ghai's request. The soundtrack got excellent reviews and was immensely praised. The lyrics were penned by Javed Akhtar. According to the Indian trade website Box Office India, with around 12,00,000 units sold, this film's soundtrack album was the year's twelfth highest-selling.

References

External links
 
 

2000s Hindi-language films
2000s historical romance films
2005 films
Films about interracial romance
Films directed by Subhash Ghai
Films set in the 1940s
Films set in the Indian independence movement
Films scored by A. R. Rahman
Films scored by Ismail Darbar
Indian musical drama films
Indian historical musical films
Indian historical romance films